The Downingtown Industrial and Agricultural School  (DIAS) was a school for African Americans in Chester County, Pennsylvania from 1905 until 1993. Its motto was "Self help through self work". 

It was located in what is now East Brandywine Township.

History
The school was founded by John S. Trower and William A. Creditt. Both were well-known, successful African Americans from Philadelphia. Tower was a local businessman and Creditt was pastor of the city's first African Baptist church. The school's purpose was to provide vocational training. By 1907, an illustrated report on the school was published showings the school's chapel, barn, dining room, and sewing room. The school was included in Philadelphia's colored directory in 1910.

The school was aimed at educating African-American youth. In July 1912 the school announced that it would be sending 15 graduates to Lincoln University that Fall.

James H. N. Waring (1890 - 1973) served as the school's principal.

Mortelia Womack, who worked as a secretary for W. E. B. Du Bois, applied for a job in the school in 1931 and Du Bois sent the school's principal, J. H. N. Waring, Jr., a reference for her. 

In 1980, a thirty-six-page publication about the school was printed.

Notable alumni include Cab Callaway famous for, among other things, Minnie the Moocher, or The Hi-De-Ho song.

Legacy
Delaware County Community College's Downington campus is on the site of the former school.

See also
Manual labor college

References

Further reading
 "Letter from the Downingtown Industrial and Agricultural School to W. E. B. Du Bois, September 3, 1931". University of Massachusetts Amherst.

Community colleges in Pennsylvania
African-American history in Philadelphia
Chester County, Pennsylvania
1905 establishments in Pennsylvania
1993 disestablishments in Pennsylvania
Educational institutions established in 1905